Charles N. Youngblood Jr. was an American politician who served as a Democratic member of the Michigan Senate from 1963 until his resignation in 1974.

Early life and education 
Born in Detroit in 1932, Youngblood attended Denby High School and Wayne State University.

Career 
Youngblood served in the United States Navy during the Korean War and was a deputy sheriff in Wayne County. Youngblood was elected to the 1961 Constitutional Convention.

Youngblood was convicted of conspiracy to bribe a public official over a liquor license and resigned from the Senate in 1974.

References

Living people
1932 births
Michigan Democrats
Politicians from Detroit
Wayne State University alumni